Henry Jackson may refer to:

Military
 Henry Jackson (Continental Army general) (1747–1809), American colonial leader
 Henry R. Jackson (1820–1898), American Civil War general
 Henry Jackson (Royal Navy officer) (1855–1929), British First Sea Lord
 Henry Jackson (British Army officer) (1879–1972), British Army General
 USS Henry M. Jackson (SSBN-730), missile submarine

Politics
 Henry Jackson (Minnesota pioneer) (1811–1857), American pioneer and legislator
 Henry Jackson (surveyor) (1830–1906), New Zealand politician and surveyor
 Sir Henry Jackson, 2nd Baronet (1831–1881), British MP for Coventry
 Henry Jackson (colonial administrator) (1849–1908), British colonial administrator
 Sir Henry Jackson, 1st Baronet (1875–1937), British Conservative MP for Wandsworth Central
 Henry M. Jackson (1912–1983), known as Scoop, American politician
 Henry Jackson Society, British conservative think tank

Sports
 Henry Jackson (football manager) (c. 1850–1930), English football secretary-manager and director
 Henry Jackson (baseball) (1861–1932), Major League Baseball player
 Henry Jackson (Australian footballer) (1877–1964), Australian rules footballer
 Henry Jackson (athlete), Jamaican Olympic long jumper
 Henry Melody Jackson Jr. aka Henry Armstrong (1912–1988), American boxer

Other
 Henry Jackson (priest) (1586–1662), English priest and literary editor
 Henry Melville Jackson (1840–1900), assistant bishop of the Episcopal Diocese of Alabama
 Henry Jackson (classicist) (1839–1921), English classicist
 Henry L. Jackson (died 1948), American businessman, editor, and journalist
 Henry Jackson (businessman) (born 1964)
 Henry Jackson (1956–2014), rapper Big Bank Hank

See also
Harry Jackson (disambiguation)
Sir Henry Mather-Jackson, 3rd Baronet (1855–1942), Lord Lieutenant of Monmouthshire

Jackson, Henry